Květa Pacovská (28 July 1928 – 6 February 2023) was a Czech illustrator and writer. She received the international Hans Christian Andersen Medal in 1992 for her "lasting contribution to children's literature".

Life and career
Pacovská was born in Prague and studied at its School of Applied Arts, where she mainly worked in graphic art, arts, conceptual art and artist book fields. For many years she developed a career as a graphic designer and participated in more than 50 exhibitions. In 1961, she started drawing picture books for her own children. Her work is characterised by the use of geometric forms and vibrant colours, mainly red. "White and black are not included in the colour spectrum but for me they are colours and mean maximum contrast. And maximum contrast is the maximum beauty. I am striving for maximum contrast. Red and green.The placing of colours one over the other. It depends on the relation, proportion, rhythm, size, amount and how we placed colours together.It is like music. Each individual tone is beautiful by itself and in certain groupings we create new dimensions, harmony, disharmony, symphonies, operas and books for children." The biennial Hans Christian Andersen Award conferred by the International Board on Books for Young People is the highest recognition available to a writer or illustrator of children's books. Pacovská received the illustration award in 1992.

Works

Books
 One, Five, Many (1990)  - counting book for children; as writer/illustrator
 Midnight Play (1994)  - as writer/illustrator
 Flying (1995)  - as writer/illustrator
 The Little Match Girl by Hans Christian Andersen (2005)  - as illustrator
 Unfold/Enfold (2005)  - art/picture book
 The Little Flower King (2007)  - as writer/illustrator
 The Sun Is Yellow (2012)  - as artist/illustrator
 Number Circus 1-10 and back Again (2012)  - counting book for children; as artist/illustrator

CD-ROMs
 Midnight Play Simon & Schuster Audio, CD-Rom edition (1999) 
 Alphabet Tivola Electronic Publishing; CD-Rom edition (2000)  ASIN B000056WJY

Catalogues
 The Art of Květa Pacovská (The art of...catalogues) (1994) 
 Open Space (2001) 
 Pacovská Exhibition Catalog Maximum kontrast

See also

References

External links 
 Pacovská's invited artist in the 2nd CJ Picture Book Festival, Korea, 2009 (archive)
 Astra Publishing House
 Memory of nations: Květa Pacovská
 Kveta Pacovska . An Illustrator from Prague
 
 

1928 births
2023 deaths
Artists from Prague
Czech illustrators
Czech children's book illustrators
Hans Christian Andersen Award for Illustration winners
Czech women artists
Pop-up book artists